Erich Neumann may refer to:

Erich Neumann (politician) (1892–1948 or 1951), Nazi politician
Erich Neumann (psychologist) (1905–1960), psychologist and writer

See also
Erich Naumann (1905–1951), German Nazi SS officer and war criminal